Ibrahim Badr (Arabic: ابراهيم بدر) is a Lebanese musician who was the bass player of alternative rock band Mashrou' Leila He is also a Product Manager at Google and has worked on Google Calendar, Google Assistant, and Google Lens.

References

External links
Ibrahim Badr Linkedin
Ibrahim Badr Instagram
Mashrou’ Leila: The Soundtrack of an Arab Generation

Lebanese rock musicians
Alternative rock musicians
Musicians from Beirut
American University of Beirut alumni
Year of birth missing (living people)
Living people